is a Japanese actor, model and television personality who is affiliated with Horipro. He was a Rissho University Global Environmental Sciences student. He is best known for his role as Shinnosuke Tomari, the main character of the Kamen Rider series Kamen Rider Drive.

Biography
Takeuchi is the oldest brother in family with one sister and one brother. He is left-handed. His real name is Ryo Takeuchi. His parents love the sounds of "Ryo", so they gave the name Ryo to him. The kanji "崚" of his name is quite rare to use in a name.

Takeuchi started playing soccer when he was five, he belonged to Tokyo Verdy when he was young. He originally went to a college on a soccer recommendation, but did not pursue a soccer career.

In April 2013, Takeuchi was featured in the female magazine Mina, after winning the audition  Mina Kare Grand Prix, which was contested by 2,457 people. He has acted in films and television series.

From 2014–2015 Takeuchi played the protagonist, Shinnosuke Tomari/Kamen Rider Drive in Kamen Rider Drive.

In November 21, 2016, Takeuchi was one of the three winners of 2016 Best Stylish Award.

In 2017, Takeuchi had breakthrough roles as Jun'ichiro Shimatani in NHK Morning Drama (Asadora) Hiyokko, as Hajime Mugino in NTV Drama Kahogo no Kahoko and as Hiroto Mogi in TBS Sunday Drama Rikuoh.

In January 2020, he played his first leading role in a Sunday Theatre (TBS) in Ship of Theseus. He's the youngest to have led in Sunday Theatre at the age of 26. 

In April 25, 2022, Takeuchi was cast in TV Asahi's drama Roppongi Class, a remake of the hit South Korean drama series 'Itaewon Class' as Arata Miyabe.

Filmography

TV series

Web drama

Film

Special

Dubbing roles

Awards

Stage performances 

 2021 ミュージカル「17 AGAIN」/ Musical '17 AGAIN'  role: Mike (Lead)

Music videos appearances

References

External links
 
 Official profile at Horipro 
 
 Official Instagram

1993 births
Living people
Japanese male film actors
Japanese male television actors
Japanese male models
Male actors from Tokyo
21st-century Japanese male actors